Angel de Jesús Sánchez (August 9, 1891 in Ciales, Puerto Rico – April 30, 1951) was a Puerto Rican jurist who served as Chief Justice of the Supreme Court of Puerto Rico from 1948 till 1951.

After graduating from the Central High School in Santurce, Puerto Rico in 1910 went to Cornell Law School in Ithaca, New York, to study the law. He started practicing as a lawyer in 1913. Was appointed municipal judge in Juana Díaz, Puerto Rico in 1915. Served also as municipal judge in Coamo, Puerto Rico and San Juan, Puerto Rico. After a few years in private practice. He was appointed to the United States bankruptcy court where he spent twelve years.

After serving as district judge in San Juan, Puerto Rico, Angel de Jesús Sánchez was nominated as Associate Justice of the Supreme Court of Puerto Rico in 1938 by president Harry S. Truman. In 1948 was appointed as the 5th Chief Justice of the Supreme Court of Puerto Rico also by president Truman. Held that position until his death on April 30, 1951 at age 59.

References
http://www.ramajudicial.pr/sistema/supremo/presidentes/dejesus-new.htm

|-

1891 births
1951 deaths
Chief Justices of the Supreme Court of Puerto Rico
Cornell Law School alumni
People from Ciales, Puerto Rico
Puerto Rican judges
20th-century American judges